Tulcán Canton is a canton of Ecuador, located in Carchi Province. Its capital is the city of Tulcán. The population of the canton in the 2001 census was 77,175 and 86,498 in the 2010 census.

Most of the population of the canton is in the Andes, especially in the city and surroundings of Tulcán, but the land area stretches into the Andes foothills to the west. The northern limit of the canton is the border with Colombia with the most important land passage between the two countries at Rumichaca Bridge.

The canton is sub-divided into ten parishes: El Carmelo (El Pun), El Chical, Julio Andrade (Orejuela), Maldonado, Pioter, Santa Martha de Cuba, Tobar Donoso (La Bocana de Camumbi), Tufiño, Tulcán, and Urbina (Taya).

Richard Carapaz, winner of the Giro d'Italia and the first Ecuadorian to win a Grand Tour of cycling was born in El Carmelo.

Demographics
Ethnic groups as of the Ecuadorian census of 2010:
Mestizo  87.4%
Indigenous  5.3%
Afro-Ecuadorian  3.6%
White  3.3%
Montubio  0.3%
Other  0.2%

References

Cantons of Carchi Province